A glioblast is a type of cell derived from neuroectoderm and with the ability to differentiate into several different types of neuroglia.

It comes from a precursor (spongioblast). However, the latter may also differentiate into an ependymoblast.

Glioblasts differentiate into astrocytes and oligodendrocytes. Its tumor is called a glioblastoma, and is the most common type of central nervous system malignancy.

See also 

 Glioblastoma multiforme

 List of human cell types derived from the germ layers

References 

 

Embryology of nervous system